The U.S. Highways in Kansas are the segments of the United States Numbered Highway System within the state of Kansas.



Mainline highways

Special routes

See also

References

External links

 Kansas Highway Maps: Current, Historic, KDOT

 
U.S.